Marasmius crinis-equi is a plant pathogen. It is commonly known as the 'horse hair fungus', and appears on rainforest leaves as a wiry stipe with a delicate fruitbody. The cap of the fruitbody can be up to 4 mm in diameter, and is pale brown.

See also
List of Marasmius species

References

Fungi described in 1880
Fungal plant pathogens and diseases
crinis-equi